The 1904 Summer Olympics were held in St. Louis, Missouri, United States from July 1 to November 23, 1904, as part of the St. Louis World's Fair. 

A total of 651 athletes from 12 nations participated in 95 events in 16 sports at these games.

Nine participating nations earned medals, in addition to four medals won by mixed teams. In the early Olympic Games, several team events were contested by athletes from multiple nations. Retroactively, the IOC created the designation "mixed team" (with the country code ZZX) to refer to these groups of athletes. Some athletes won medals both individually and as part of a mixed team, so these medals are tabulated under different nations in the official counts.

The United States won 231 medals, setting a record that still stands today. The Soviet Union came closest to beating the record with 195 medals at the 1980 Summer Olympics and currently is in second place. The Soviets, however, won a record 80 gold medals, surpassing 76 golds won by the Americans in 1904. However, the United States subsequently won 83 gold medals in the 1984 Summer Olympics, setting another all-time record. Gold medals were awarded to event winners for the first time at the 1904 games. Prior to that, a silver medal was awarded to first-place finishers and a bronze medal to second-place finishers.

Medal table 

This is the full table of the medal count of the 1904 Summer Olympics, based on the medal count of the International Olympic Committee (IOC). There are sources, besides the International Olympic Committee (IOC), that display variations in the medal totals, but as the governing body of the Olympic Games, the IOC is considered the most authoritative source for the purposes of this article. These rankings sort by the number of gold medals earned by a country. The number of silver medals is taken into consideration next and then the number of bronze medals. If, after the above, countries are still tied, equal ranking is given and they are listed alphabetically. This follows the system used by the IOC.

References

External links
 
 
 

Medal table
1904